Rau Assembly constituency is one of the 230 Vidhan Sabha (Legislative Assembly) constituencies of Madhya Pradesh state in central India.

Overview 

Rau Assembly constituency is one of the 8 Vidhan Sabha constituencies located in Indore district which comes under Indore (Lok Sabha constituency). Constituency includes Rau, Ralamandal, Piplya Patwari and Bicholi Hapsi suburb of Indore city.

Members of Legislative Assembly

Election results

2013 results

See also

 Indore
 Indore (Lok Sabha constituency)

References

Assembly constituencies of Madhya Pradesh
Politics of Indore